The Golden Horseshoe Junior Hockey League (GHL) was a junior ice hockey league in Ontario, Canada, sanctioned by the Ontario Hockey Association from 1974 until 2007.  In 2007, the league became a division of the newly formed Greater Ontario Junior Hockey League along with the Mid-Western Junior Hockey League and Western Ontario Hockey League.

History
The year 1974 saw the founding of the Golden Horseshoe Junior B Hockey League.  The league consisted mostly of "inner ring" teams from the Niagara District Junior B Hockey League.  The "outer ring" teams maintained with the Niagara league.  In 1978, the Golden Horseshoe league jumped from six to nine teams by swallowing the majority of the short-lived Southwestern Junior B Hockey League.  A season later, the Niagara District league folded and their final champion, the Fort Erie Meteors, came aboard as the GHL's tenth team.

In 1995-96 and 1996–97, the GHL played an interlocking schedule with USA Hockey's North Eastern Junior Hockey League.  In 1997-98, the league even allowed the expansion of one of the NEJHL's teams, the Rochester Jr. Americans for a single season.

In 2005-06, the GHL allowed another former NEJHL team, the Wheatfield Jr. Blades, to participate in the league.

In 2007, the league merged with the Western Ontario Hockey League and the Mid-Western Junior Hockey League to form the Greater Ontario Junior Hockey League.

2007-08 season
For information on the 2007-08 season, please see: Greater Ontario Junior Hockey League.

Final teams
These are the teams that were in the league during its final independent season (2006-07).
Fort Erie Meteors
Niagara Falls Canucks
Port Colborne Sailors
St. Catharines Falcons
Stoney Creek Warriors
Thorold Blackhawks
Welland Jr. Canadians
Wheatfield Jr. Blades

Other former members
Brantford Classics
Buffalo Jr. Sabres
Caledonia Corvairs
Dundas Blues
Dunnville Terriers
Grimsby Peach Kings
Hamilton Mountain Bees
Hamilton Red Wings
Simcoe Jets
Tillsonburg Mavericks

Former interleague opponents
Pittsburgh Renegades
Rochester Jr. Americans
Springfield Jr. Indians

Playoff Champions

Records
Records taken from Official Website.
Best record: 1997-98 Niagara Falls Canucks (43-3-3)
Worst record: 1993-94 Fort Erie Meteors (1-38-1)

External links
Golden Horseshoe Junior B Website
OHA Website

Defunct ice hockey leagues in Ontario